JAMA Dermatology is a monthly peer-reviewed medical journal published by the American Medical Association. It covers the effectiveness of diagnosis and treatment in medical and surgical dermatology, pediatric and geriatric dermatology, and oncologic and aesthetic dermatologic surgery.

The journal was established in 1960 as the Archives of Dermatology, obtaining its current name in January 2013. According to Journal Citation Reports, the journal has a 2021 impact factor of 11.816, ranking it 2nd out of 69 journals in the category "Dermatology". The editor-in-chief is Kanade Shinkai (University of California, San Francisco).

Abstracting and indexing 
The journal is abstracted and indexed in Index Medicus/MEDLINE/PubMed.

See also
List of American Medical Association journals

References

External links

Dermatology journals
Monthly journals
English-language journals
American Medical Association academic journals
Publications established in 1960